Suzhou Xinqu railway station is a railway station of Shanghai–Nanjing intercity railway located in Suzhou New District, Suzhou, Jiangsu, People's Republic of China.

Metro station
It is served by Line 3 and will be served by Line 6 of Suzhou Rail Transit, serving as the Northern terminus for both lines.

Railway stations in Suzhou
Stations on the Shanghai–Nanjing Intercity Railway